Werner Korff (18 December 1911 – 11 February 1999) was a German ice hockey player, born in Berlin, who competed in the 1932 Winter Olympics.

In 1932 he was a member of the German ice hockey team, which won the bronze medal. He played all six matches.

External links
Werner Korff's profile at databaseOlympics.com
Werner Korff's profile at Sports Reference.com

1911 births
1999 deaths
Berliner SC players
Ice hockey people from Berlin
Ice hockey players at the 1932 Winter Olympics
Medalists at the 1932 Winter Olympics
Olympic bronze medalists for Germany
Olympic ice hockey players of Germany
Olympic medalists in ice hockey